is a passenger railway station in the city of Katori, Chiba Japan, operated by the East Japan Railway Company (JR East).

Lines
Sawara Station is served by the Narita Line, and is located 40.0 kilometers from the terminus of line at Sakura Station. Some trains for the Kashima Line originate at this station.

Layout
Sawara Station has a single bay platform serving two tracks, and an island platform, for a total of four tracks. The island platform is connected to the bay platform by a footbridge. The station has a Midori no Madoguchi staffed ticket office.

Platforms

History
Sawara Station was opened on February 3, 1898 as a terminal station on the Narita Railway Company for both freight and passenger operations. The Narita Railway was nationalised on September 1, 1920, becoming part of the Japanese Government Railway (JGR). After World War II, the JGR became the Japan National Railways (JNR). Scheduled freight operations were suspended from February 1, 1984. The station was absorbed into the JR East network upon the privatization of the Japan National Railways (JNR) on April 1, 1987. The station building was rebuilt from 2007–2011.

Passenger statistics
In fiscal 2019, the station was used by an average of 3090 passengers daily (boarding passengers only).

Surrounding area
 old town of Sawara
 Ino Tadataka Museum
 Katori City Hall

Bus Terminal
Ōtō Bus
For Koyo Chuo
For Koda Shako
Edosaki
JR Bus Kanto
For Tako Bus Terminal
Chiba Kotso
For Takodai Bus Terminal
For Omigawa Station
Keisei Bus, Kanto Railway and Chiba Kotsu
For Namba Station
For Kyoto Station
For Tokyo Station
For Hokota Station via Itako Station
For Choshi Station via Omigawa Station

See also
 List of railway stations in Japan

References

External links

JR East station information 

Railway stations in Japan opened in 1898
Railway stations in Chiba Prefecture
Kashima Line
Narita Line
Katori, Chiba